The 1972 Pittsburgh Pirates season was the 91st season of the Pittsburgh Pirates franchise; the 86th in the National League. The defending World Series champion Pirates finished first in the National League East with an MLB-best record of 96–59. The team was defeated three games to two by the Cincinnati Reds in the 1972 National League Championship Series. Despite losing the series, the Pirates put up a good fight, unlike the last time the two teams met in the playoffs. In Game 5, the Pirates led 3-2 in the 9th inning, and were 3 outs away from pulling off a major upset over the Reds. All looked good until the Pirates collapsed in the 9th inning and allowed 2 runs to score, with the walkoff run coming on a wild pitch.

Offseason 
 November, 1971: Danny Murtaugh steps down as Manager of the Pirates citing health reasons. Coach Bill Virdon is named Manager.
 January 12, 1972: Larry Demery was drafted by the Pirates in the 7th round of the 1972 Major League Baseball draft (Secondary Phase).
 March 15, 1972: José Martínez was purchased from the Pirates by the Kansas City Royals.

Regular season

Season standings

Record vs. opponents

Detailed records

Game log

|- bgcolor="ffbbbb"
| 1 || April 15 || @ Mets || 0–4 || Seaver || Ellis (0–1) || McGraw || 15,893 || 0–1
|- bgcolor="ccffcc"
| 2 || April 16 || @ Mets || 2–0 || Blass (1–0) || Gentry || Hernández (1) || 23,241 || 1–1
|- bgcolor="ffbbbb"
| 3 || April 18 || Cubs || 4–6 || Pappas || Moose (0–1) || McGinn || 47,489 || 1–2
|- bgcolor="ccffcc"
| 4 || April 19 || Cubs || 5–2 || Briles (1–0) || Pizarro || — || 9,171 || 2–2
|- bgcolor="ccffcc"
| 5 || April 20 || Cubs || 7–5 || Ellis (1–1) || Jenkins || Giusti (1) || 6,529 || 3–2
|- bgcolor="ccffcc"
| 6 || April 21 || @ Phillies || 3–2 (10) || Hernández (1–0) || Short || — || 13,864 || 4–2
|- bgcolor="ffbbbb"
| 7 || April 23 || @ Phillies || 4–5 (11) || Brandon || Miller (0–1) || — || 43,438 || 4–3
|- bgcolor="ccffcc"
| 8 || April 25 || Reds || 5–2 (13) || Miller (1–1) || McGlothlin || — || 6,509 || 5–3
|- bgcolor="ffbbbb"
| 9 || April 26 || Reds || 6–7 || Nolan || Blass (1–1) || Borbon || 6,380 || 5–4
|- bgcolor="ffbbbb"
| 10 || April 27 || Reds || 4–5 || Carroll || Giusti (0–1) || — || 12,504 || 5–5
|- bgcolor="ffbbbb"
| 11 || April 28 || Braves || 5–13 || Jarvis || Moose (0–2) || McQueen || 12,804 || 5–6
|- bgcolor="ffbbbb"
| 12 || April 29 || Braves || 5–9 || Kelley || Walker (0–1) || Stone || 10,684 || 5–7
|- bgcolor="ffbbbb"
| 13 || April 30 || Braves || 1–6 || Niekro || Johnson (0–1) || — || 12,264 || 5–8
|-

|- bgcolor="ffbbbb"
| 14 || May 1 || Astros || 8–9 || Ray || Giusti (0–2) || — || 4,788 || 5–9
|- bgcolor="ccffcc"
| 15 || May 3 || Astros || 3–2 || Ellis (2–1) || Reuss || Kison (1) || 9,522 || 6–9
|- bgcolor="ffbbbb"
| 16 || May 5 || @ Reds || 4–5 (10) || Carroll || Giusti (0–3) || — || 24,722 || 6–10
|- bgcolor="ccffcc"
| 17 || May 6 || @ Reds || 8–1 || Blass (2–1) || Borbon || — || 12,284 || 7–10
|- bgcolor="ccffcc"
| 18 || May 7 || @ Reds || 9–6 || Briles (2–0) || Billingham || Moose (1) || 19,281 || 8–10
|- bgcolor="ccffcc"
| 19 || May 9 || @ Braves || 5–2 || Ellis (3–1) || Kelley || Kison (2) || 7,762 || 9–10
|- bgcolor="ffbbbb"
| 20 || May 10 || @ Braves || 4–8 || Niekro || Johnson (0–2) || — || 6,708 || 9–11
|- bgcolor="ccffcc"
| 21 || May 12 || @ Astros || 4–2 || Blass (3–1) || Dierker || Miller (1) || 17,863 || 10–11
|- bgcolor="ccffcc"
| 22 || May 13 || @ Astros || 6–1 (12) || Moose (1–2) || Gladding || Miller (2) || 23,568 || 11–11
|- bgcolor="ffbbbb"
| 23 || May 14 || @ Astros || 6–7 || Wilson || Briles (2–1) || Ray || 14,704 || 11–12
|- bgcolor="ccffcc"
| 24 || May 15 || Cardinals || 4–1 || Ellis (4–1) || Gibson || — || 8,640 || 12–12
|- bgcolor="ccffcc"
| 25 || May 16 || Cardinals || 4–3 || Walker (1–1) || Wise || Giusti (2) || 8,272 || 13–12
|- bgcolor="ccffcc"
| 26 || May 17 || Cardinals || 12–0 || Blass (4–1) || Cleveland || — || 9,188 || 14–12
|- bgcolor="ccffcc"
| 27 || May 19 || Expos || 8–0 || Moose (2–2) || Stoneman || — || 41,765 || 15–12
|- bgcolor="ccffcc"
| 28 || May 20 || Expos || 6–0 || Ellis (5–1) || Morton || Kison (3) || 11,602 || 16–12
|- bgcolor="ccffcc"
| 29 || May 21 || Expos || 1–0 || Walker (2–1) || McAnally || Hernández (2) || 30,418 || 17–12
|- bgcolor="ccffcc"
| 30 || May 21 || Expos || 5–3 || Giusti (1–3) || Gilbert || — || 30,418 || 18–12
|- bgcolor="ccffcc"
| 31 || May 23 || @ Cardinals || 6–2 || Blass (5–1) || Cleveland || Hernández (3) || 11,795 || 19–12
|- bgcolor="ccffcc"
| 32 || May 24 || @ Cardinals || 9–4 (14) || Miller (2–1) || Higgins || — || 10,794 || 20–12
|- bgcolor="ffbbbb"
| 33 || May 25 || @ Cardinals || 2–4 || Gibson || Ellis (5–2) || — || 9,293 || 20–13
|- bgcolor="ccffcc"
| 34 || May 26 || Phillies || 6–4 || Briles (3–1) || Carlton || — || 25,164 || 21–13
|- bgcolor="ffbbbb"
| 35 || May 27 || Phillies || 1–2 (12) || Brandon || Giusti (1–4) || Short || 19,398 || 21–14
|- bgcolor="ccffcc"
| 36 || May 28 || Phillies || 6–5 || Hernández (2–0) || Hoerner || — || 15,236 || 22–14
|- bgcolor="ccffcc"
| 37 || May 29 || Phillies || 7–3 || Hernández (3–0) || Fryman || — || 36,464 || 23–14
|- bgcolor="ccffcc"
| 38 || May 29 || Phillies || 4–2 || Moose (3–2) || Reynolds || Giusti (3) || 36,464 || 24–14
|- bgcolor="ffbbbb"
| 39 || May 31 || @ Expos || 2–3 || McAnally || Briles (3–2) || — || 10,565 || 24–15
|-

|- bgcolor="ffbbbb"
| 40 || June 2 || @ Giants || 4–7 || Marichal || Johnson (0–3) || — || 6,669 || 24–16
|- bgcolor="ccffcc"
| 41 || June 3 || @ Giants || 4–3 || Blass (6–1) || McDowell || Giusti (4) || 11,216 || 25–16
|- bgcolor="ccffcc"
| 42 || June 4 || @ Giants || 4–3 || Miller (3–1) || Johnson || Giusti (5) ||  || 26–16
|- bgcolor="ccffcc"
| 43 || June 4 || @ Giants || 9–1 || Kison (1–0) || Williams || — || 19,929 || 27–16
|- bgcolor="ccffcc"
| 44 || June 7 || @ Padres || 12–5 || Johnson (1–3) || Norman || — ||  || 28–16
|- bgcolor="ccffcc"
| 45 || June 7 || @ Padres || 1–0 (18) || Miller (4–1) || Corkins || Johnson (1) || 7,371 || 29–16
|- bgcolor="ccffcc"
| 46 || June 8 || @ Padres || 11–2 || Moose (4–2) || Arlin || — || 2,949 || 30–16
|- bgcolor="ccffcc"
| 47 || June 9 || @ Dodgers || 5–1 || Blass (7–1) || Sutton || — || 35,078 || 31–16
|- bgcolor="ffbbbb"
| 48 || June 10 || @ Dodgers || 1–2 || Osteen || Walker (2–2) || Brewer || 38,937 || 31–17
|- bgcolor="ccffcc"
| 49 || June 11 || @ Dodgers || 7–5 || Kison (2–0) || Mikkelsen || Giusti (6) || 40,846 || 32–17
|- bgcolor="ffbbbb"
| 50 || June 14 || Giants || 1–3 || McDowell || Ellis (5–3) || — || 14,552 || 32–18
|- bgcolor="ccffcc"
| 51 || June 15 || Giants || 4–1 || Briles (4–2) || Stone || Giusti (7) ||  || 33–18
|- bgcolor="ccffcc"
| 52 || June 15 || Giants || 9–7 || Moose (5–2) || Bryant || Hernández (4) || 21,126 || 34–18
|- bgcolor="ccffcc"
| 53 || June 16 || Padres || 2–1 || Blass (8–1) || Norman || — || 17,020 || 35–18
|- bgcolor="ffbbbb"
| 54 || June 17 || Padres || 0–4 || Kirby || Walker (2–3) || — || 20,718 || 35–19
|- bgcolor="ffbbbb"
| 55 || June 18 || Padres || 0–1 || Arlin || Kison (2–1) || — || 27,143 || 35–20
|- bgcolor="ccffcc"
| 56 || June 19 || Dodgers || 13–3 || Ellis (6–3) || Sutton || Miller (3) || 15,430 || 36–20
|- bgcolor="ffbbbb"
| 57 || June 21 || Dodgers || 3–5 (10) || Brewer || Moose (5–3) || — || 15,209 || 36–21
|- bgcolor="ccffcc"
| 58 || June 23 || @ Cubs || 4–2 || Blass (9–1) || Jenkins || Giusti (8) || 28,177 || 37–21
|- bgcolor="ccffcc"
| 59 || June 24 || @ Cubs || 3–1 || Briles (5–2) || Hands || Giusti (9) || 27,543 || 38–21
|- bgcolor="ccffcc"
| 60 || June 25 || @ Cubs || 9–2 || Ellis (7–3) || Hooton || Giusti (10) || 35,099 || 39–21
|- bgcolor="ffbbbb"
| 61 || June 26 || @ Mets || 2–4 || Koosman || Moose (5–4) || McGraw || 48,820 || 39–22
|- bgcolor="ffbbbb"
| 62 || June 27 || @ Mets || 4–7 || Frisella || Walker (2–4) || — || 38,152 || 39–23
|- bgcolor="ffbbbb"
| 63 || June 28 || Expos || 1–3 || Stoneman || Blass (9–2) || — || 13,470 || 39–24
|- bgcolor="ccffcc"
| 64 || June 29 || Expos || 9–0 || Briles (6–2) || McAnally || — || 18,364 || 40–24
|- bgcolor="ffbbbb"
| 65 || June 30 || Cubs || 3–4 || Reuschel || Ellis (7–4) || Aker || 22,745 || 40–25
|-

|- bgcolor="ccffcc"
| 66 || July 1 || Cubs || 4–3 || Giusti (2–4) || Jenkins || — || 16,102 || 41–25
|- bgcolor="ccffcc"
| 67 || July 2 || Cubs || 7–4 || Kison (3–1) || Hands || Hernández (5) || 25,229 || 42–25
|- bgcolor="ccffcc"
| 68 || July 3 || Cubs || 3–2 || Giusti (3–4) || Hooton || — || 26,933 || 43–25
|- bgcolor="ffbbbb"
| 69 || July 4 || @ Astros || 0–6 || Dierker || Briles (6–3) || — || 31,164 || 43–26
|- bgcolor="ccffcc"
| 70 || July 5 || @ Astros || 6–4 || Johnson (2–3) || Forsch || — || 23,646 || 44–26
|- bgcolor="ccffcc"
| 71 || July 6 || @ Astros || 7–3 (17) || Hernández (4–0) || Ray || — || 23,540 || 45–26
|- bgcolor="ccffcc"
| 72 || July 7 || @ Braves || 10–2 || Walker (3–4) || Kelley || — ||  || 46–26
|- bgcolor="ffbbbb"
| 73 || July 7 || @ Braves || 2–3 || Hardin || Kison (3–2) || — || 25,253 || 46–27
|- bgcolor="ccffcc"
| 74 || July 8 || @ Braves || 5–3 || Blass (10–2) || Reed || Giusti (11) || 20,256 || 47–27
|- bgcolor="ccffcc"
| 75 || July 9 || @ Braves || 7–4 || Briles (7–3) || McLain || — || 20,130 || 48–27
|- bgcolor="ffbbbb"
| 76 || July 11 || @ Reds || 0–5 || Billingham || Moose (5–5) || — || 24,047 || 48–28
|- bgcolor="ffbbbb"
| 77 || July 12 || @ Reds || 3–6 || Simpson || Walker (3–5) || Carroll || 28,058 || 48–29
|- bgcolor="ffbbbb"
| 78 || July 13 || @ Reds || 0–2 || Nolan || Blass (10–3) || Carroll || 32,060 || 48–30
|- bgcolor="ccffcc"
| 79 || July 14 || Astros || 5–2 || Briles (8–3) || Dierker || — || 24,487 || 49–30
|- bgcolor="ccffcc"
| 80 || July 15 || Astros || 5–1 || Ellis (8–4) || Forsch || Giusti (12) || 16,202 || 50–30
|- bgcolor="ccffcc"
| 81 || July 16 || Astros || 3–2 (10) || Giusti (4–4) || Gladding || — ||  || 51–30
|- bgcolor="ccffcc"
| 82 || July 16 || Astros || 3–2 || Kison (4–2) || Wilson || Giusti (13) || 49,341 || 52–30
|- bgcolor="ccffcc"
| 83 || July 17 || Braves || 6–5 || Hernández (5–0) || Hoerner || Giusti (14) || 14,866 || 53–30
|- bgcolor="ffbbbb"
| 84 || July 18 || Braves || 2–4 || Reed || Blass (10–4) || — || 20,162 || 53–31
|- bgcolor="ccffcc"
| 85 || July 19 || Braves || 8–3 || Briles (9–3) || Niekro || Walker (1) || 24,847 || 54–31
|- bgcolor="ffbbbb"
| 86 || July 21 || Reds || 5–11 || Borbon || Kison (4–3) || Gullett || 32,255 || 54–32
|- bgcolor="ffbbbb"
| 87 || July 22 || Reds || 3–6 || Sprague || Moose (5–6) || Carroll || 40,837 || 54–33
|- bgcolor="ccffcc"
| 88 || July 23 || Reds || 3–2 || Blass (11–4) || Grimsley || Hernández (6) || 29,487 || 55–33
|- bgcolor="ffbbbb"
| 89 || July 27 || Mets || 0–1 (10) || Matlack || Briles (9–4) || — ||  || 55–34
|- bgcolor="ccffcc"
| 90 || July 27 || Mets || 7–5 || Moose (6–6) || Koosman || Giusti (15) || 49,886 || 56–34
|- bgcolor="ccffcc"
| 91 || July 28 || Mets || 3–1 || Ellis (9–4) || Seaver || — || 39,035 || 57–34
|- bgcolor="ffbbbb"
| 92 || July 29 || @ Phillies || 2–5 || Fryman || Blass (11–5) || Selma || 37,544 || 57–35
|- bgcolor="ccffcc"
| 93 || July 29 || @ Phillies || 3–2 || Walker (4–5) || Brandon || Giusti (16) || 37,544 || 58–35
|- bgcolor="ccffcc"
| 94 || July 30 || @ Phillies || 7–1 || Kison (5–3) || Lersch || — || 28,451 || 59–35
|- bgcolor="ccffcc"
| 95 || July 31 || @ Phillies || 2–0 || Moose (7–6) || Reynolds || — || 17,455 || 60–35
|-

|- bgcolor="ffbbbb"
| 96 || August 1 || @ Cardinals || 4–7 || Santorini || Briles (9–5) || Segui || 23,712 || 60–36
|- bgcolor="ffbbbb"
| 97 || August 2 || @ Cardinals || 5–10 (7) || Gibson || Ellis (9–5) || — || 24,961 || 60–37
|- bgcolor="ccffcc"
| 98 || August 3 || @ Cardinals || 2–1 (10) || Blass (12–5) || Wise || Hernández (7) || 14,836 || 61–37
|- bgcolor="ffbbbb"
| 99 || August 4 || @ Expos || 1–2 || Moore || Kison (5–4) || — || 18,436 || 61–38
|- bgcolor="ccffcc"
| 100 || August 5 || @ Expos || 7–4 || Briles (10–5) || Stoneman || Giusti (17) || 20,905 || 62–38
|- bgcolor="ccffcc"
| 101 || August 6 || @ Expos || 8–0 || Moose (8–6) || Torrez || — ||  || 63–38
|- bgcolor="ccffcc"
| 102 || August 6 || @ Expos || 7–2 || Johnson (3–3) || Renko || Hernández (8) || 28,330 || 64–38
|- bgcolor="ccffcc"
| 103 || August 8 || Phillies || 4–2 || Ellis (10–5) || Champion || — || 18,228 || 65–38
|- bgcolor="ffbbbb"
| 104 || August 9 || Phillies || 0–2 || Carlton || Blass (12–6) || — || 19,832 || 65–39
|- bgcolor="ccffcc"
| 105 || August 11 || Cardinals || 10–5 || Briles (11–5) || Cleveland || Hernández (9) || 34,248 || 66–39
|- bgcolor="ccffcc"
| 106 || August 12 || Cardinals || 6–5 || Moose (9–6) || Gibson || Giusti (18) || 23,474 || 67–39
|- bgcolor="ffbbbb"
| 107 || August 13 || Cardinals || 0–2 || Wise || Ellis (10–6) || — ||  || 67–40
|- bgcolor="ccffcc"
| 108 || August 13 || Cardinals || 7–5 || Blass (13–6) || Santorini || Giusti (19) || 47,300 || 68–40
|- bgcolor="ffbbbb"
| 109 || August 15 || @ Dodgers || 6–8 || Richert || Johnson (3–4) || Brewer || 27,484 || 68–41
|- bgcolor="ccffcc"
| 110 || August 16 || @ Dodgers || 3–2 || Miller (5–1) || Sutton || — || 28,318 || 69–41
|- bgcolor="ffbbbb"
| 111 || August 17 || @ Dodgers || 2–4 || Downing || Moose (9–7) || Richert || 29,777 || 69–42
|- bgcolor="ccffcc"
| 112 || August 18 || @ Padres || 4–2 || Blass (14–6) || Greif || — || 30,610 || 70–42
|- bgcolor="ccffcc"
| 113 || August 20 || @ Padres || 9–3 || Ellis (11–6) || Corkins || Johnson (2) ||  || 71–42
|- bgcolor="ccffcc"
| 114 || August 20 || @ Padres || 5–2 || Kison (6–4) || Norman || — || 9,759 || 72–42
|- bgcolor="ccffcc"
| 115 || August 22 || @ Giants || 1–0 || Briles (12–5) || Marichal || — || 9,389 || 73–42
|- bgcolor="ffbbbb"
| 116 || August 23 || @ Giants || 0–8 || Barr || Moose (9–8) || — || 8,330 || 73–43
|- bgcolor="ccffcc"
| 117 || August 25 || Dodgers || 3–2 (12) || Giusti (5–4) || Richert || — ||  || 74–43
|- bgcolor="ffbbbb"
| 118 || August 25 || Dodgers || 3–4 || Osteen || Kison (6–5) || — || 39,574 || 74–44
|- bgcolor="ffbbbb"
| 119 || August 26 || Dodgers || 3–7 || Sutton || Ellis (11–7) || — || 20,174 || 74–45
|- bgcolor="ffbbbb"
| 120 || August 27 || Dodgers || 4–7 || Mikkelsen || Briles (12–6) || Brewer || 25,672 || 74–46
|- bgcolor="ccffcc"
| 121 || August 28 || Padres || 5–3 || Moose (10–8) || Caldwell || Hernández (10) || 13,438 || 75–46
|- bgcolor="ccffcc"
| 122 || August 29 || Padres || 5–3 || Blass (15–6) || Corkins || Giusti (20) || 12,329 || 76–46
|- bgcolor="ccffcc"
| 123 || August 30 || Padres || 11–0 || Kison (7–5) || Arlin || — || 19,009 || 77–46
|-

|- bgcolor="ccffcc"
| 124 || September 1 || Giants || 10–6 || Ellis (12–7) || Bryant || Giusti (21) || 20,678 || 78–46
|- bgcolor="ccffcc"
| 125 || September 2 || Giants || 6–3 || Briles (13–6) || McDowell || — || 14,194 || 79–46
|- bgcolor="ccffcc"
| 126 || September 3 || Giants || 2–1 (10) || Giusti (6–4) || Johnson || — || 16,760 || 80–46
|- bgcolor="ccffcc"
| 127 || September 4 || Phillies || 10–0 || Blass (16–6) || Twitchell || — || 26,627 || 81–46
|- bgcolor="ccffcc"
| 128 || September 4 || Phillies || 5–1 || Kison (8–5) || Nash || — || 26,627 || 82–46
|- bgcolor="ccffcc"
| 129 || September 6 || Cubs || 4–0 || Ellis (13–7) || McGinn || — || 12,470 || 83–46
|- bgcolor="ffbbbb"
| 130 || September 7 || Cubs || 2–4 || Hooton || Briles (13–7) || — || 12,306 || 83–47
|- bgcolor="ccffcc"
| 131 || September 8 || @ Expos || 7–1 || Johnson (4–4) || Morton || — ||  || 84–47
|- bgcolor="ccffcc"
| 132 || September 8 || @ Expos || 4–2 (12) || Giusti (7–4) || Marshall || Hernández (11) || 12,118 || 85–47
|- bgcolor="ccffcc"
| 133 || September 9 || @ Expos || 8–3 || Blass (17–6) || Stoneman || — || 17,092 || 86–47
|- bgcolor="ffbbbb"
| 134 || September 10 || @ Expos || 2–8 || Torrez || Kison (8–6) || — || 20,253 || 86–48
|- bgcolor="ccffcc"
| 135 || September 12 || @ Cubs || 7–0 || Ellis (14–7) || Hooton || Giusti (22) || 4,153 || 87–48
|- bgcolor="ccffcc"
| 136 || September 13 || @ Cubs || 6–4 || Briles (14–7) || Jenkins || Hernández (12) || 4,418 || 88–48
|- bgcolor="ccffcc"
| 137 || September 14 || @ Cubs || 5–2 || Moose (11–8) || Reuschel || Hernández (13) || 4,603 || 89–48
|- bgcolor="ffbbbb"
| 138 || September 15 || @ Cardinals || 4–10 || Wise || Kison (8–7) || — || 10,853 || 89–49
|- bgcolor="ffbbbb"
| 139 || September 16 || @ Cardinals || 0–4 || Santorini || Blass (17–7) || — || 11,850 || 89–50
|- bgcolor="ffbbbb"
| 140 || September 17 || @ Cardinals || 4–5 || Cleveland || Miller (5–2) || Segui || 11,802 || 89–51
|- bgcolor="ffbbbb"
| 141 || September 18 || @ Mets || 0–1 || Matlack || Briles (14–8) || — || 15,622 || 89–52
|- bgcolor="ccffcc"
| 142 || September 19 || @ Mets || 5–1 || Moose (12–8) || Koosman || — || 15,537 || 90–52
|- bgcolor="ffbbbb"
| 143 || September 20 || @ Mets || 1–4 || Seaver || Walker (4–6) || — || 15,147 || 90–53
|- bgcolor="ccffcc"
| 144 || September 21 || @ Mets || 6–2 || Blass (18–7) || Gentry || — || 10,991 || 91–53
|- bgcolor="ccffcc"
| 145 || September 22 || Expos || 4–3 (12) || McKee (1–0) || Marshall || — || 15,365 || 92–53
|- bgcolor="ffbbbb"
| 146 || September 23 || Expos || 0–3 || McAnally || Briles (14–9) || — || 8,580 || 92–54
|- bgcolor="ffbbbb"
| 147 || September 24 || Expos || 1–2 || Morton || Moose (12–9) || — || 9,116 || 92–55
|- bgcolor="ccffcc"
| 148 || September 26 || @ Phillies || 5–1 || Blass (19–7) || Champion || — || 8,472 || 93–55
|- bgcolor="ccffcc"
| 149 || September 27 || @ Phillies || 3–1 || Kison (9–7) || Reynolds || Walker (2) || 5,335 || 94–55
|- bgcolor="ffbbbb"
| 150 || September 28 || @ Phillies || 1–2 || Carlton || Moose (12–10) || — || 12,216 || 94–56
|- bgcolor="ffbbbb"
| 151 || September 29 || Mets || 0–1 || Seaver || Briles (14–10) || — || 24,193 || 94–57
|- bgcolor="ccffcc"
| 152 || September 30 || Mets || 5–0 || Ellis (15–7) || Matlack || Johnson (3) || 13,117 || 95–57
|-

|- bgcolor="ffbbbb"
| 153 || October 1 || Mets || 3–7 || Koosman || Blass (19–8) || — || 30,031 || 95–58
|- bgcolor="ccffcc"
| 154 || October 3 || Cardinals || 6–2 || Moose (13–10) || Santorini || Hernández (14) || 5,905 || 96–58
|- bgcolor="ffbbbb"
| 155 || October 4 || Cardinals || 3–4 || Gibson || Briles (14–11) || — || 4,603 || 96–59
|-

|-
| Legend:       = Win       = LossBold = Pirates team member

Opening Day lineup

Notable transactions 
 June 6, 1972: 1972 Major League Baseball draft
John Candelaria was drafted by the Pirates in the 2nd round.
Ken Macha was drafted by the Pirates in the 6th round.
Willie Randolph was drafted by the Pirates in the 7th round.
 September 2, 1972 Bob Veale was sold by the Pirates to the Boston Red Sox.

Roster

Player stats

Batting

Starters by position 
Note: Pos = Position; G = Games played; AB = At bats; H = Hits; Avg. = Batting average; HR = Home runs; RBI = Runs batted in

Other batters 
Note: G = Games played; AB = At bats; H = Hits; Avg. = Batting average; HR = Home runs; RBI = Runs batted in

Pitching

Starting pitchers 
Note: G = Games pitched; IP = Innings pitched; W = Wins; L = Losses; ERA = Earned run average; SO = Strikeouts

Other pitchers 
Note: G = Games pitched; IP = Innings pitched; W = Wins; L = Losses; ERA = Earned run average; SO = Strikeouts

Relief pitchers 
Note: G = Games pitched; W = Wins; L = Losses; SV = Saves; ERA = Earned run average; SO = Strikeouts

National League Championship Series

Awards and honors 
1972 Major League Baseball All-Star Game

Farm system 

LEAGUE CHAMPIONS: Salem, Niagara Falls

Notes

References 
 1972 Pittsburgh Pirates at Baseball Reference
 1972 Pittsburgh Pirates at Baseball Almanac

Pittsburgh Pirates seasons
Pittsburgh Pirates season
National League East champion seasons
Pittsburg